Fox River Township is a township in Davis County, Iowa, USA.  As of the 2000 census, its population was 330.

History
Fox River Township was organized in 1846. It was named from the Fox River.

Geography
Fox River Township covers an area of 28.07 square miles (72.7 square kilometers); of this, 0.15 square miles (0.4 square kilometers) or 0.55 percent is water. The streams of Center Branch Fox River and North Fox Creek run through this township.

Unincorporated towns
 Paris
(This list is based on USGS data and may include former settlements.)

Adjacent townships
 Marion Township (north)
 Cleveland Township (east)
 Drakesville Township (east)
 West Grove Township (south)
 Washington Township, Appanoose County (southwest)
 Udell Township, Appanoose County (west)

Cemeteries
The township contains seven cemeteries: Baptist, Hammans, McConnell, Paris, Pelly, Runkles and West Union.

References
 U.S. Board on Geographic Names (GNIS)
 United States Census Bureau cartographic boundary files

External links
 US-Counties.com
 City-Data.com

Townships in Davis County, Iowa
Townships in Iowa